Akmyrat Jumanazarow (born 5 November 1987) is a Turkmenistan footballer currently playing for Energetik FK. He has also been capped by the national team 10 times.

International career
Jumanazarow has played for Turkmenistan 10 times, playing in the 2012 AFC Challenge Cup and 2014 AFC Challenge Cup editions as well as the respective qualifying matches.

Honors
AFC Challenge Cup:
Runners-up: 2012

References

1987 births
Living people
Turkmenistan footballers
Turkmenistan international footballers
Association football utility players
Association football defenders
People from Mary Region